The Roman Catholic Diocese of Raiganj is a diocese located in the city of Raiganj in the Ecclesiastical province of Calcutta in India.

History
 June 8, 1978: Established as the Diocese of Raiganj from the Diocese of Dumka

Leadership
 Bishops of Raiganj (Latin Rite)
 Bishop Alphonsus F. D'Souza, S.J. (January 26, 1987 – April 30, 2016)
 Bishop Leo Tigga, S.J. (June 8, 1978 – January 29, 1986)

References

External links
 GCatholic.org 
 Catholic Hierarchy 

Roman Catholic dioceses in India
Christian organizations established in 1978
Roman Catholic dioceses and prelatures established in the 20th century
Christianity in West Bengal
1978 establishments in West Bengal
Uttar Dinajpur district
Raiganj